Stephen Milne (born 29 April 1994) is a Scottish swimmer who competed at the 2016 Summer Olympics in Rio de Janeiro, Brazil.

Personal life
Milne was born on 29 April 1994 in Inverness, Scotland, United Kingdom. He went to school at Perth Academy and is now studying at Perth College, University of the Highlands and Islands, for a Bachelor of Science degree in Environmental Science.

Swimming
Milne competed at the 2012 European Junior Swimming Championships, held in Antwerp, Belgium. He finished eighth in the 200-metre freestyle and was part of the British team that placed fourth in the 4 × 200-metre freestyle relay.

He competed at the 2014 European Aquatics Championships held in Berlin, Germany, reaching the final in the 400-metre freestyle, 800-metre freestyle and the 1500 metre freestyle, placing fourth in the latter with a new personal best. At the 2014 Commonwealth Games in Glasgow, Scotland he represented the host nation. In the 400-metre freestyle he won his heat in a time of three minutes 46.48 seconds to advance to the final, where he finished eighth. In the 1500 metre freestyle he was second in his heat behind Canadian Ryan Cochrane and qualified for the final where he finished fifth. In the final of the 4 × 200-metre freestyle relay he competed alongside Daniel Wallace, Duncan Scott and Robert Renwick as the Scottish quartet won the silver medal behind Australia.

In January 2015 he travelled to Perth, Australia, to complete warm weather training. At the 2015 World Aquatics Championships in Kazan, Russia, he placed seventh in the final of the 800-metre freestyle and fifth in the 1500 metre freestyle. He won the silver in the 400 metres freestyle at the 2016 British Championships, setting a new personal best time of three minutes 46.53 seconds in the final. He also won the silver medal in the 1500 metres freestyle.

Milne was selected as part of the 26-member swimming squad for the Great Britain team at the 2016 Summer Olympics held in Rio de Janeiro, Brazil where he competed in the men's 400-metre and 1500 metre freestyle events,  finishing 13th and 10th respectively. He also competed in the  freestyle relay with James Guy, Duncan Scott, and Dan Wallace, and won a silver.

In 2017 at the World Championships in Budapest, he won gold in the  freestyle event with Guy, Scott and Nick Grainger.

At the 2018 Commonwealth Games held at the Gold Coast, Australia, Milne won two bronzes as part of the Scottish team that finished third in the Men's  and  freestyle events.

At the 2018 European Championships, Milne won bronze as part of the team that won mixed 4 × 200 metre freestyle relay, a new event at the game.  He was also part of the team that won gold in men's 4 × 200 m freestyle relay, he swam in the heats but not in the final.

Career best times

Long course (50-meter pool)

Short course (25m pool)

References

External links

Living people
1994 births
Scottish male freestyle swimmers
Commonwealth Games silver medallists for Scotland
Commonwealth Games bronze medallists for England
Swimmers at the 2014 Commonwealth Games
Swimmers at the 2018 Commonwealth Games
Swimmers at the 2022 Commonwealth Games
Sportspeople from Inverness
Swimmers at the 2016 Summer Olympics
Olympic swimmers of Great Britain
Olympic silver medallists for Great Britain
Olympic silver medalists in swimming
Medalists at the 2016 Summer Olympics
Commonwealth Games medallists in swimming
Scottish Olympic medallists
World Aquatics Championships medalists in swimming
European Aquatics Championships medalists in swimming
Alumni of the University of the Highlands and Islands
People educated at Perth Academy
20th-century Scottish people
21st-century Scottish people
Medallists at the 2014 Commonwealth Games
Medallists at the 2018 Commonwealth Games
Medallists at the 2022 Commonwealth Games